Tomer Elbaz (born 3 July 1989) is an Israeli footballer who currently plays at Maccabi Yavne.

References

External links
 

1989 births
Living people
Israeli footballers
Maccabi Petah Tikva F.C. players
Hapoel Bnei Lod F.C. players
Hapoel Katamon Jerusalem F.C. players
Hapoel Petah Tikva F.C. players
F.C. Kafr Qasim players
Hapoel Ironi Baqa al-Gharbiyye F.C. players
Hapoel Asi Gilboa F.C. players
F.C. Haifa Robi Shapira players
Maccabi Yavne F.C. players
Israeli Premier League players
Liga Leumit players
Footballers from Petah Tikva
Israeli people of Moroccan-Jewish descent
Association football central defenders